The European Youth Music Festival is a music festival held annually in Europe. The 9th festival in 2007 was held in Budapest, Hungary, the 10th to take place in Linz, Austria in 2009.

External links 
 9th European Youth Music Festival, 2007.
 10th European Youth Music Festival, 2009.
 11th European Youth Music Festival, 2012

Music festivals staged internationally
Children's music festivals
Music festivals in Europe
Music festivals established in 2007